is a former Japanese football player.

Club statistics

References

External links

J. League (#22)

1988 births
Living people
Osaka Sangyo University alumni
Association football people from Hyōgo Prefecture
Japanese footballers
J1 League players
J2 League players
Shimizu S-Pulse players
Matsumoto Yamaga FC players
Association football midfielders